This is a list of countries by artichoke production in 2016, based on data from the Food and Agriculture Organization Corporate Statistical Database. The estimated total world artichoke production for 2016 was 1,422,248 metric tonnes.

Production by country

Notes

References

Lists of countries by production
Artichoke
Artichoke